Rodrigo Antônio Magalhães Alves Pereira, known as Rodrigo Arroz, (born March 21, 1984 in Valença), is a Brazilian central defender. He currently plays for Paulista.

Career
Rodrigo Arroz began his youth career in Flamengo. In 2005, he had formally signed a contract with the professional club and had played until the end of the 2007–2008 season.

On 8 January 2011, he has joined Grêmio Prudente.

In November 2015, Arroz was signed as an injury for Sanchez Watt by Kerala Blasters.

Honours
Brazilian Cup: 2006
Taça Guanabara: 2007, 2008
Rio de Janeiro State League: 2007, 2008

References

External links
 sambafoot
 zerozero.pt
 soccerterminal
 Guardian Stats Centre

1984 births
Living people
Brazilian footballers
Association football defenders
Brazilian expatriate footballers
Expatriate footballers in Portugal
Campeonato Brasileiro Série A players
Campeonato Brasileiro Série B players
CR Flamengo footballers
C.F. Os Belenenses players
Grêmio Barueri Futebol players
Boa Esporte Clube players
Clube Atlético Linense players
Sociedade Esportiva e Recreativa Caxias do Sul players
Kerala Blasters FC players
Expatriate footballers in India
Paulista Futebol Clube players
Sampaio Corrêa Futebol Clube players
Esporte Clube Tigres do Brasil players
Sportspeople from Rio de Janeiro (state)
People from Valença, Rio de Janeiro